"Luv 4 Luv" is a song by American singer Robin S., released in July 1993 as the second single from her debut album, Show Me Love (1993). It was written by Allen George and Fred McFarlane and was Robin S.'s second number one on the US dance chart, where it spent one week at the top, and a total of eleven weeks on the chart. On other US charts, the song went to number 53 on the Billboard Hot 100 and number 52 on the soul singles chart. Overseas, "Luv 4 Luv" reached number 11 on the UK Singles Chart and number 24 in Ireland. A black-and-white music video was produced to accompany the song. It sees Robin S. performing the song in a self-service laundry. "Luv 4 Luv" was re-released in the UK in 2003 but only lasted one week on the chart, peaking at number 78.

Critical reception
Larry Flick from Billboard wrote, "The up-and-coming Ms S. is out to prove that "Show Me Love" was no fluke with this aggressive dance ditty from her sturdy debut album," adding, "Although the production is a little too familiar for its own good at times, the song itself is quite cool, and Robin cuts loose like a well-seasoned diva. Her star power is helping the track win the hearts of club pundits." Rod Edwards from the Gavin Report felt it "has the potential to be even bigger" than "Show Me Love", remarking that "a boomin' kick drum and carefully arranged synthesizers provide a "house"-influenced track, and Robin's emotion-filled vocals spice up the rhythm."

Brad Beatnik from Music Week'''s RM Dance Update stated "expect this slice of pure garage heaven to be huge". Another editor, James Hamilton described it as a "typically wailed garage strider". Wendi Cermak from The Network Forty wrote, "Keeping with the same formula [...] the Maven of House is back with another strong rhythmic mover. Although it could be argued that this single is very similar to "Show Me Love", "Luv 4 Luv" has so many subtle differences that it's not hard to tell the two apart." James T. Jones IV from USA Today complimented her "gutsy, gospel-trained voice" that "digs deep" into the groove. James Hunter from Vibe'' felt that it "brings personality and addictive soul to techno's faceless pulse. Plus, Robin S. have a friendly voice that can fire right up."

Track listings

Some UK pressings had 8 tracks listed on the CD and inlay of the1993 release. "Luv 4 Luv (Stone's Instrumental)" was listed but NOT included. The correct track listing is as shown above.

Personnel
 Producer – Allen George, Fred McFarlane
 Co-producer – StoneBridge
 Mix – StoneBridge, P. Dennis Mitchell, Junior Vasquez
 Engineer – P. Dennis Mitchell, Dave Sussman, Nat Foster, Robert Kiss
 Keyboards – Fred McFarlane, Joe Moskowitz, Matt Thomas, Stonebridge, Robert Kiss
 Guitar – Paul Jackson Jr., Dana Reed, Mike Cantwell
 Backing vocals – Dana Reed, Debbie Cole, Dennis Taylor, Kim Miller, Luci Martin, Robin Stone, Vivian Sessoms

Charts

Weekly charts

Year-end charts

See also
 List of number-one dance singles of 1993 (U.S.)

References

1993 singles
1993 songs
Big Beat Records (American record label) singles
Black-and-white music videos
Champion Records singles
Robin S. songs
Songs written by Fred McFarlane
ZYX Music singles